This is a list of provincial highways in the Canadian territory of Yukon. Several are part of the Canadian National Highway System.

See also

List of Yukon roads

References

Yukon Highways and Public Works, Driving Yukon Highways 2007

Yukon territorial highways
Highways